Zhu Mi Lei is a former Chinese female short track speed skater. She is a World champion and a World silver medallist, four-time silver medallist of the World Team Championships, champion and a bronze medallist of the 2007 Asian Winter Games as well as champion and multiple medallist of the Winter Universiade. She was a reserve athlete in the Chinese team at the 2006 Winter Olympics.

During her World Cup career, Zhu Mi Lei achieved four relay victories, five personal and four relay silver podiums as well as two personal bronze podiums. Her first personal World Cup podium was during the 2003–04 season when she finished second in 500 m in Calgary. Her last personal podium was during the 2006–07 season.

References

External links
 ISU profile
 Profile at www.shorttrackonline.info

Living people
Chinese female short track speed skaters
21st-century Chinese women
Short track speed skaters at the 2007 Asian Winter Games
Medalists at the 2007 Asian Winter Games
Universiade medalists in short track speed skating
Medalists at the 2003 Winter Universiade
Medalists at the 2005 Winter Universiade
1984 births
Universiade gold medalists for China
Universiade silver medalists for China
Universiade bronze medalists for China